The Minister of Tourism is the head of the governmental department that specializes in tourism, recreation and/or culture.

The position exists in many different countries under several names:
Ministry of Tourism and Environment (Albania)
Ministry of Tourism and Sports (Argentina)
Minister for Tourism (Australia)
Minister for Tourism, Major Events, Hospitality and Racing (New South Wales)
Minister for Tourism (Western Australia)
Ministry of Tourism (Brazil)
Ministry of Primary Resources and Tourism (Brunei)
Bahamas Ministry of Tourism
Minister of Tourism (Canada)
Ministry of Tourism and Recreation (Ontario) (former ministry)
Ministry of Tourism and Culture (Ontario)
Ministry of Tourism (Croatia)
Minister of Tourism (France)
Minister of Tourism (Greece)
Commissioner for Tourism (Hong Kong)
Ministry of Education, Science and Culture (Iceland)
Ministry of Tourism (India)
Ministry of Tourism and Creative Economy (Indonesia)
Ministry of Cultural Heritage, Handicrafts and Tourism (Iran)
Minister for Tourism, Culture, Arts, Gaeltacht, Sport and Media (Ireland)
Ministry of Tourism (Lebanon)
Minister of Tourism (Malaysia)
Ministry of Hotels and Tourism (Myanmar)
Ministry of Tourism (Pakistan)
Ministry of Foreign Commerce and Tourism (Peru)
Department of Tourism (Philippines)
Tourism Minister of Israel
Ministry of Tourism (Mauritius)
Minister of Tourism (New Zealand)
Rivers State Ministry of Culture and Tourism
Ministry of Tourism (Pakistan)
Department of Tourism (South Africa)
Ministry of Tourism (Syria)
Ministry of Natural Resources and Tourism (Tanzania)
Ministry of Tourism and Sports (Thailand)
Ministry of Culture and Tourism (Turkey)
Minister for Tourism and Heritage (United Kingdom)
Parliamentary Under Secretary of State for Arts, Heritage and Tourism (United Kingdom)
United States Department of Commerce
Ministry of Culture, Sports and Tourism (Vietnam)
Ministry of Tourism and Arts (Zambia)
Ministry of Tourism (Zimbabwe)

See also
Ministry of Culture and Tourism (disambiguation)
Secretary of Tourism (disambiguation)

 
 
Tourism